The 1982–83 Northern Football League season was the 85th in the history of Northern Football League, a football competition in England. The Northern League expanded to two divisions this season for the first time since 1899–1900.

Division One

Division One featured 19 clubs which competed in the league last season, no new clubs joined the division this season.

League table

Division Two

This was the first season since 1899–1900 the league ran with a Division Two. The Division was formed by eleven clubs.
Clubs joined from the Northern Football Alliance:
 Alnwick Town
 Bedlington Terriers
 Esh Winning
 Ryhope Community
Clubs joined from the Wearside Football League:
 Hartlepool United reserves
 Peterlee Newtown
Plus:
 Billingham Town, joined from the Teesside Football League
 Darlington reserves
 Gretna, joined from the Carlisle and District League
 Northallerton Town, joined from the Harrogate and District Football League
 Norton & Stockton Ancients

League table

References

External links
 Northern Football League official site

Northern Football League seasons
1982–83 in English football leagues